The Lockheed Model 75 Saturn was a small, short-route commercial aircraft produced by the Lockheed Corporation in the mid-1940s. Lockheed announced the project on November 19, 1944. The design team, led by Don Palmer, created a high-wing, twin-engine monoplane with 14 seats and a top speed of 228 mph (367 km/h). Lockheed touted the Saturn's capability to take on passengers and cargo without ramps or stairs, making it suitable for small-town airports with limited facilities.

Tony LeVier piloted the first flight on June 17, 1946. Lockheed had received 500 conditional orders for this aircraft, priced at $85,000 each. But, by the time the design was completed, the selling price had risen to $100,000 and these orders had been cancelled, with war surplus C-47s filling the same market at a quarter the price. Lockheed lost $6 million from the development of the two prototypes, which were scrapped in 1948.

Specifications

References

Notes

Bibliography
 Boyne, Walter J., Beyond the Horizons: The Lockheed Story. St. Martin's Press: New York, 1998.
Francillon, René J. Lockheed Aircraft since 1913. London:Putnam, 1982. 

Saturn
1940s United States airliners
High-wing aircraft
Abandoned civil aircraft projects of the United States
Aircraft first flown in 1946
Twin piston-engined tractor aircraft